Darija Jurak and María José Martínez Sánchez were the defending champions but Martínez Sánchez retired from professional tennis in 2020, whilst Jurak chose not to participate.

Anna Blinkova and Simona Waltert won the title, defeating Han Na-lae and Hiroko Kuwata in the final, 6–3, 6–3.

Seeds

Draw

Draw

References

External Links
Main Draw

2022 Doubles
Bronx Open - Doubles